Keiko Nagatomi (born 22 November 1974) is a Japanese former professional tennis player.

Nagatomi, who had a highest singles ranking of 271, won four ITF titles and had her best WTA Tour performance at the 1999 Tashkent Open, where she made the second round. As a doubles player, she won a further 12 ITF titles and featured in the qualifying draw for the 1997 Wimbledon Championships.

ITF Circuit finals

Singles: 5 (4 titles, 1 runner-up)

Doubles: 15 (12 titles, 3 runner-ups)

References

External links
 
 

1974 births
Living people
Japanese female tennis players
20th-century Japanese women
21st-century Japanese women